Opuntia stenopetala is a species low bushy cactus, often forming thickets or mats, the main branches creeping and resting on the edges of the joints. Its native range is within Mexico. It is dioecious, with male and female flowers on separate plants.

References

External links
 
 

stenopetala
Dioecious plants